Aergol Longhand (Modern Welsh: Aergol Lawhir; c. 437  c. 515) was a legendary king of Dyfed and son and heir of King Triffyn Farfog.

His name is the Welsh form of the Latin Agricola, just as his father's 'name' is the Cambrian form of "tribune".

Some sources claim he was born around 437. His court was at Lis Castell (Lydstep) near Din Bych (Tenby); there may have been another at Castell Argoel (probably Caeth Argoel) in Dyfed, which was presumably named in his honor. He was a patron of the church at Llandaff and the bishops of Glywysing Saints Teilo and Euddogwy. He received Euddogwy's father King Budic II of Brittany after the latter was expelled from his land and was remembered by Gildas as a "good king".
Aergol was known to be an enemy of King Cynan Garwyn of Powys and they clashed at Crug Dyfed. He possibly conquered the Ystrad Tywi around the late 400s which was why he was given the name “Long-Hand.”

References

437 births
515 deaths
Monarchs of Dyfed